Khaur is a town and union council in Pindigheb Tehsil of Attock District in Punjab Province of Pakistan.

Community
The major tribes of town are Chauhan , Muradiya(مرادیا)٫Kahut, Awan, Budhwaal and Shipraal while main language is ghebi dialect of hindko, and most of the population is Sunni Hanfi BrailviMuslim.

Khaur Oil Field 
The town is the first site of an oilfield in Punjab which operated from 1911 to the 1950s. The first commercial success came with the drilling of Khaur-1 by Pakistan Oilfields Limited in 1915, on a surface anticline in the Potwar Basin. Oil was discovered in sands in the lower part of the Miocene formation, and a total of 396 shallow wells were drilled in the field from 1915 to 1954.

References 

Cities and towns in Attock District
Union councils of Attock District